49th NSFC Awards
January 3, 2015

Best Film:
 Goodbye to Language 

The 49th National Society of Film Critics Awards, given on 3 January 2015, honored the best in film for 2014.

Winners
Winners are listed in boldface along with the runner-up positions and counts from the final round:

Best Picture
 Goodbye to Language (25)
 Boyhood (24)
 Birdman (10)
 Mr. Turner (10)

Best Director
 Richard Linklater – Boyhood (36)
 Jean-Luc Godard – Goodbye to Language (17)
 Mike Leigh – Mr. Turner (12)

Best Actor
 Timothy Spall – Mr. Turner (31)
 Tom Hardy – Locke (10)
 Joaquin Phoenix – Inherent Vice (9)
 Ralph Fiennes – The Grand Budapest Hotel (9)

Best Actress
 Marion Cotillard – The Immigrant and Two Days, One Night (80)
 Julianne Moore – Still Alice (35)
 Scarlett Johansson – Lucy and Under the Skin (21)

Best Supporting Actor
 J. K. Simmons – Whiplash (24)
 Mark Ruffalo – Foxcatcher (21)
 Edward Norton – Birdman (16)

Best Supporting Actress
 Patricia Arquette – Boyhood (26)
 Agata Kulesza – Ida (18)
 Rene Russo – Nightcrawler (9)

Best Screenplay
 Wes Anderson – The Grand Budapest Hotel (24)
 Paul Thomas Anderson – Inherent Vice (15)
 Alejandro G. Iñárritu, Nicolás Giacobone, Alexander Dinelaris Jr., and Armando Bo – Birdman (15)

Best Cinematography
 Dick Pope – Mr. Turner (33)
 Darius Khondji – The Immigrant (27)
 Fabrice Aragno – Goodbye to Language (9)

Best Non-Fiction Film
 Citizenfour – Laura Poitras (56)
 National Gallery – Frederick Wiseman (19)
 The Overnighters – Jesse Moss (17)

Film Heritage Awards
The Film Heritage Awards were presented for the restorations of classical work of artists in field of film and music:

 To Ron Magliozzi, associate curator, and Peter Williamson, film conservation manager, of the Museum of Modern Art, for identifying and assembling the earliest surviving footage of what would have been the feature film to star a black cast, the 1913 Lime Kiln Field Day starring Bert Williams.
 To Ron Hutchison, co-founder and director of The Vitaphone Project, which since 1991 has collected and restored countless original soundtrack discs for early sound short films and features, including the recent Warner Bros. restoration of William A. Seiter's 1929 Why Be Good?

Dedication
As per tradition, ceremony was dedicated to the memory of two distinguished members of the Society who died in the previous year; in 2014 the honorees were Jay Carr and Charles Champlin.

References

External links
 Official website
 Best of 2014: Film Critic Top Ten Lists

2014 film awards
2014
2015 in American cinema